Alan Graham Carr (born 14 June 1976) is an English comedian, broadcaster and writer. His breakthrough was in 2001, winning the City Life Best Newcomer of the Year and the BBC New Comedy Awards. In the ensuing years, Carr's career burgeoned on the Manchester comedy circuit before he became known for co-hosting The Friday Night Project (2006–2009) with Justin Lee Collins. This led to the release of a short-lived entertainment show Alan Carr's Celebrity Ding Dong (2008), and he went on to star in the comedy chat show Alan Carr: Chatty Man (2009–2016) which aired on Channel 4. Since 2017, Carr often stands in as a team captain on 8 Out of 10 Cats Does Countdown. In 2019, he became a judge on RuPaul's Drag Race UK. In 2021, he took over from Fearne Cotton as host of BBC’s Interior Design Masters.

Carr hosted the radio show Going Out with Alan Carr on BBC Radio 2 (2009–2012), as well as releasing his autobiography book Look Who It Is! (2008), and going on three arena stand-up comedy tours: Tooth Fairy Live (2007), Spexy Beast Live (2011) and Yap, Yap, Yap! (2015). Carr has won three British Comedy Awards (2007, 2008, 2013), two National Television Awards (2012, 2015) and a BAFTA TV Award (2013).

Early life
Alan Graham Carr was born on 14 June 1976 in Weymouth, Dorset, oldest son of Christine and Graham Carr, and spent the majority of his childhood in Northampton. His father, whose family comes from the North East of England, is a former Northampton Town manager and Newcastle United chief scout. Carr has a younger brother, Gary.

Carr went to Weston Favell Upper School in Northampton and graduated from Middlesex University with a 2:1 BA (Hons) degree in Drama and Theatre Studies.

After completing his degree in his early 20s, Carr moved to Manchester, aspiring to be a comedian. He lived in Chorlton-cum-Hardy after which he moved to Stretford, which he cites as an inspiration for his comedic work. Carr worked in a call centre for five years and performed on the comedy circuit in his spare time, before moving into comedy as a full-time career.

Career

Television & film
Carr's early TV career included guest appearances on 8 Out of 10 Cats in 2005 and The Law of the Playground in 2006. He and Justin Lee Collins co-hosted The Friday Night Project from series two in 2006 until it was cancelled after the end of series eight in February 2009. Carr went on to host two series of Channel 4's game show Alan Carr's Celebrity Ding Dong from 2007-2009, and the chat show Alan Carr: Chatty Man, which ran for 16 series from 2009-2016, with Christmas Specials in 2016 and 2017.

Radio
Carr made his radio presenting debut on Christmas Day 2007 for BBC Radio 2 as part of their Festive Highlights with the show Alan Carr's Christmas Box. He filled in on BBC Radio 6 Music on 16 February and 14 June 2008 for Adam and Joe and co-presented The Russell Brand Show on 4 October 2008. He also presented Alan Carr's Comedy Outings for BBC Radio 2 in 2008.

On 25 April 2009, Carr began hosting Going Out with Alan Carr, a new show for BBC Radio 2, in conjunction with Emma Forbes (later replaced by Melanie Sykes). The show was broadcast every Saturday evening from 6pm to 8pm. On 6 March 2012 it was reported that he had made the decision to leave to focus on his Chatty Man show. His last show was on 31 March 2012. Carr was replaced by Liza Tarbuck. He returned on Boxing Day 2015 for a one-off show on the station.

For four weeks in January/February 2017 Carr again returned to BBC Radio 2 to sit in for Paul O'Grady on his Sunday show. Carr reunited with Sykes to present a 10-week show called Summer Escapes sitting in for Graham Norton on Saturdays from July to September on BBC Radio 2 yearly from 2017 until its final run in 2020 following Norton's departure from the station. It included features based around summer including the British Seaside Survey.

Stand-up
Carr performs stand-up regularly, on tour and on television. He became a regular performer on the Manchester comedy circuit in his 20s, where he met fellow comedians Jason Manford, Justin Moorhouse and John Bishop, and had his own monthly comedy and cabaret show Alan Carr's Ice Cream Sunday at the Manchester Comedy Store.

In 2001, Carr won the City Life Best Newcomer of the Year and the BBC New Comedy Awards.

Carr has been featured in three Edinburgh shows and in 2007 he toured throughout the UK, which was followed by a DVD entitled Tooth Fairy Live. He has performed at the Apollo Theatre in London, which was televised for the BBC One series Live at the Apollo, and has been featured in the Royal Variety Performance.

He has appeared and performed at many festivals, including the Reading and Leeds Festivals, Latitude Festival and Kilkenny Comedy Festival. He has performed stand-up internationally, including an appearance at the Just for Laughs festival in Montreal.

In March 2010, Carr took part in Channel 4's Comedy Gala, a benefit show held at the 02 Arena in aid of Great Ormond Street Children's Hospital.

Personal life
Carr is gay, but does not consider his sexuality to be a focal part of his act, once saying, "I just think gay people need to get over themselves. Just because you're gay and on the telly doesn't mean you're a role model. I'm just a comedian. That's all I am. What am I meant to do? Do I go down the Julian Clary route and talk about fisting and poppers? I don't talk about being gay and I think what better equality for gays than that?" According to Carr, he has been comfortable with his sexuality from a very young age. When Eddie Izzard was a guest on Chatty Man and asked Carr when he came out of the closet, he replied that he was "never really in" and other children were already making fun of his camp behaviour when he was eight or nine years old.

In January 2018, Carr married his partner of ten years, Paul Drayton, in Los Angeles. The wedding was officiated by his best friend Adele. The couple announced their separation in January 2022 following Drayton's conviction for drink-driving. Carr lives in West Sussex, three miles from Horsham.

Controversy
When accepting his award for Best Entertainment Personality at the British Comedy Awards in December 2008, Carr dedicated it to Karen Matthews, who had earlier that month been found guilty of kidnapping Shannon Matthews, her own daughter. Carr was quoted by BBC News as stating: "I should dedicate this award to her [Karen]. She would be my dream guest. I think she's a gay icon. People like a bit of rough, don't they?"

Shahid Malik, MP for Matthews' constituency of Dewsbury, described Carr's comments about Matthews as "sick and insensitive". Carr subsequently apologised for his comments, saying "I realise what I said was insensitive and I am very sorry for any offence caused." On his own website he added: "For those of you who have enjoyed my comedy and seen my act over the last seven years you all would have got used to my tongue in cheek style and near the knuckle observations. Last night at the Comedy Awards [...] I was being ironic, these aren't my real sentiments obviously."

Filmography

Film

Television

Stand-up tours

Awards

Bibliography

References

External links

 

1976 births
Living people
20th-century English comedians
20th-century English male actors
20th-century English writers
20th-century English male writers
20th-century English LGBT people
21st-century English comedians
21st-century English male actors
21st-century English writers
21st-century English LGBT people
Alumni of Middlesex University
BBC Radio 2 presenters
Best Entertainment Performance BAFTA Award (television) winners
British atheists
British male television writers
Comedians from Manchester
Comedians from Northamptonshire
English atheists
English game show hosts
English male comedians
English male film actors
English male television actors
English stand-up comedians
English television presenters
English television talk show hosts
English television writers
English gay actors
English gay writers
English LGBT actors
British LGBT broadcasters
Gay comedians
Male actors from Dorset
Male actors from Manchester
People educated at Weston Favell Academy
People from Northampton
People from Weymouth, Dorset
RuPaul's Drag Race UK
Writers from Manchester
British LGBT comedians